Mount Merrick is a mountain,  high, standing  west of Mount Humble in the Raggatt Mountains of Antarctica. The mountain was plotted from air photos taken by the Australian National Antarctic Research Expeditions in 1956 and 1957, and was named by the Antarctic Names Committee of Australia for Robert William Merrick, a geophysicist at Mawson Station in 1960.

References

Mountains of Coats Land